Braadland is a surname. Notable people with the surname include:

Birger Braadland (1879–1966), Norwegian politician
Erik Braadland (1910–1988), Norwegian diplomat and politician, son of Birger

Norwegian-language surnames